Youngberg v. Romeo, 457 U.S. 307 (1982), was a landmark United States Supreme Court case regarding the rights of the involuntarily committed and those with intellectual disabilities. Nicholas Romeo had an intellectual disability with an infant level IQ and was committed to a Pennsylvania state hospital.  He was restrained for many hours of the day and repeatedly injured. The Supreme Court agreed with the Third Circuit Court of Appeals that involuntarily committed residents had the right to reasonably safe confinement conditions, no unreasonable body restraints and the habilitation they reasonably require.

Background
The defendants, who were management personnel at Pennhurst State School, an old state facility to which Romeo's mother had him committed when she could no longer care for him, did not dispute Romeo's right to care, habilitation, training and security.  The critical issue in the case was the standard of care and whether the defendants had violated that standard, and therefore, Romeo's federally protected civil rights.  The federal courts had not yet addressed this question in the context of intellectual disability.  The trial court therefore looked to a then-recent Supreme Court decision holding that deliberate indifference to serious medical needs of prisoners constitutes "unnecessary and wanton infliction of pain" in violation of the 8th Amendment.  The jury found for the defendants.  The 3rd Circuit reversed and ordered a new trial, explaining that the standard of care should have been based on the 14th rather than the 8th Amendment and the Supreme Court agreed.  However, the high court rejected the circuit court's articulation of the standard of care.

Opinion of the Court
The syllabus summarizes the court's holding:

Respondent [Romeo] has constitutionally protected liberty interests under the Due Process Clause of the Fourteenth Amendment to reasonably safe conditions of confinement, freedom from unreasonable bodily restraints, and such minimally adequate training as reasonably may be required by these interests.  Whether [his] constitutional rights have been violated must be determined by balancing these liberty interests against the relevant state interests.  The proper standard for determining whether the State has adequately protected such rights is whether professional judgment, in fact, was exercised.  And in determining what is 'reasonable,' courts must show deference to the judgment exercised by a qualified professional, whose decision is presumptively valid.

Subsequent developments
Shortly after it was remanded to the trial court the case was settled in conjunction with a state decision to close Pennhurst in 1986, and close all other such institutions.

See also
 Jarvis hearings
 List of United States Supreme Court cases, volume 457

References

Bibliography

External links

 APA Summary of Youngberg v. Romeo

United States Supreme Court cases
1982 in United States case law
History of Chester County, Pennsylvania
United States disability case law
Mental health law in the United States
United States Supreme Court cases of the Burger Court